Instituto Español Severo Ochoa is a Spanish international secondary school in upper-central Tangier, Morocco. Owned and operated by the Spanish Ministry of Education, it serves the obligatory secondary education (middle school) and bachillerato (senior high school/sixth form) levels of education in the upper level.

The school opened in 1949 after being created by the Decree of 1 February 1946. It was expanded and renovated in 1971.

 500 Moroccans were enrolled in the school.

Former students
 Dina Bousselham

References

External links
  

Spanish international schools in Morocco
Schools in Tangier
1949 establishments in Morocco
Educational institutions established in 1949
20th-century architecture in Morocco